Onewheel is a self-balancing single wheel electric board-sport, recreational personal transporter, often described as an electric skateboard. Unlike the electric unicycle, the rider's feet (and body) are typically pointed at a perpendicular angle to the wheel and direction of travel.

History 
The first device similar to a Onewheel was invented by Ben Smither in 2007. Future Motion Inc. founder and CEO Kyle Doerksen created a commercial version of the concept several years later. Doerksen holds two engineering degrees from Stanford University, including a master's degree in mechanical engineering. In 2013, he left his job at IDEO and started Future Motion Inc. in Santa Cruz. He launched Onewheel on Kickstarter on January 6, 2014; the Kickstarter exceeded its campaign goal of $100,000 and reached over $630,000 by January 27, 2014. The original Onewheel was released in 2015. It was followed by the Onewheel+ in 2017, the Onewheel+ XR in 2018, and the Onewheel Pint in 2019.In late 2021 Onewheel announced the latest release of onwheels, the Onewheel GT and Pint x. GT being the “Flagship” model and the Pint x being the exceeder of the original pint released in 2019, the Pint x will now have 12-18 miles of range and a top speed of 18 mph with the original Pint only having 6-8 miles of range and a top speed of 16 mph.

Future Motion Inc. was first headquartered in Mountain View, California. In 2015 the firm moved its headquarters to Santa Cruz, California and operated out of the Old Wrigley Building. The Onewheel is manufactured in Santa Cruz at a  facility within the city limits; Future Motion Inc. moved there in 2018. 

In 2015, Onewheel held the first Race for the Rail event. During the event riders race each other on mountain bike trails, competing for a cash prize. In 2020, the event was held at an undisclosed Utah ski resort in order to keep spectator numbers down during the coronavirus pandemic. The finals were live streamed on YouTube.

Onewheel Models

Onewheel 

It was shown at the Consumer Electronics Show on January 6, 2014; it has since been discontinued.

Onewheel+ 

It was discontinued in favor of the Onewheel+ XR.

Onewheel+ XR

In 2021, the Onewheel+ XR was discontinued in favor of the Onewheel GT, and was on sale at a $300 discount until the remaining XR inventory sold out on December 13, 2021. Or so we thought. In late summer of 2022, the onewheel+ XR was put on sale again on the Onewheel website for a brief amount of time due to extra inventory. It is a favorite in the community of riders due to its range, speed, durability, and ability to be modded.

Pint 

It is still in production as of 2022. This smaller platform has a lower max weight recommendation of 250lbs (113kgs)

Pint X 

It is slightly slower and has more notable pushback than an XR, but a similar range.

GT 
It uses a 6.5" diameter hub, rather than a 6" hub as previous models did, preventing standard go-kart tires from being used.

The launch of the GT has been criticized because of boards that were dead on arrival or boards that exhibited "ghosting," whereby the board would rapidly accelerate without a rider on it.

Operation 
Onewheel's single wheel contains a brushless electric motor that spins to propel riders forwards or backwards making constant small adjustments to keep riders balanced. To use the board, riders place their feet on either side of the wheel. A rider's front foot goes on top of a pressure-sensitive pad that detects when a rider is on the board; there is also a back footpad. To direct the board, riders lean slightly in the direction they want to travel. To stop, riders lift their heel off the side of the front footpad. If using the Onewheel Pint, riders can use the optional dismount system, Simplestop, by leaning back to make the board stop slowly and disengage, allowing riders to step off. The safety feature can be turned off in the Android/iOS app. The new board, Onewheel GT, will come with the new Digital Shaping 3.0 include the Simplestop feature from the Pint and Pint X.

Each Onewheel has three internal accelerometers and gyroscopes that continuously measure the orientation of the board in space. These monitors take readings approximately 14,000 times per second in order to tell the motor what to do to help riders balance and move.

All of the models use 'Pushback' to warn the rider that they are about to reach the maximum safe speed. Pushback gently forces the nose of the Onewheel up when riders approach unsafe speeds, alerting riders that they need to slow down.

Riders are able to choose to use an app that displays battery charge and miles traveled, and regulates different modes for the rider. The app also allows riders to control other board functions to personalize how the board responds to their riding style.

Terrain Ability 
One major advantage of Onewheels in comparison to e-skateboards is their ability to ride over a variety of terrain. "Onewheels are equipped with a go-kart sized tire allowing for off-road and all-terrain use." Trail riding has popularized the Onewheel sport and has created competitions such as Race for the Rails which is a Future Motion sanctioned race that is based on trail riding.

Criticism

Right to repair 
The company that manufactures Onewheels, Future Motion, has faced considerable criticism in its hostility towards third party modifications and the inability to repair the board outside of their one repair center in California. The lack of cooperation to license various other shops to do repairs has made repairing a Onewheel or getting a tire replacement without voiding its warranty a difficulty involving expensive shipping costs which can be prohibitive. Louis Rossmann, a right to repair YouTuber and lobbyist, has made several videos on Future Motion's practices.

GT issues 

Future Motion has also received criticism for its response to the Onewheel GT "ghosting" issues, whereby the board launches itself without any input from the user. On August 11th, 2022, Future Motion announced a voluntary recall of approximately 20,500 Onewheel GT front footpads to address the issue.

Consumer Production Safety Commission warning 

On November 16th, 2022, the U.S. Consumer Product Safety Commission (CPSC) issued a warning stating consumers should cease operation of all Onewheel units sold from 2014, citing safety concerns that may cause the rider to be ejected from the product. Future Motion objected to the release of CPSC's statement, and stated that Onewheel products are safe when operated following basic safe riding principles common to any board sport, including wearing a helmet and other safety gear.

Future Motion has started a petition to try and change CPSC's statement. Over 5000 letters have come in from users all over the world about their positive experience of riding Onewheels.

Third party modifications 

There is a community of creators of third-party modifications for Onewheels, including larger battery packs, auxiliary wheels ("fangs"), protective plates ("bumpers"), third-party grip tape, and more.

See also 

 Electric skateboard
 Electric unicycle
 Monowheel
 Personal transporter
 Self-balancing scooter

References

Further reading

 The Mercury News
 Santa Cruz Sentinel
 NBC Montana
 TechCrunch

Boardsports
Personal transporters